Andrés Jorquera Tapia (born January 19, 1976) is a Chilean ski mountaineer and high mountain guide. Since 2005, he has been instructor at the national mountaineering school.

Joquera Tapia attended the Juan Bosco college of the Salesianos Alameda in Santiago. Afterwards he studied metallurgy at Universidad de Santiago de Chile, and lectures administration in ecotourism at Universidad Andrés Bello.

In 2005, he participated at the 2005 South American Ski Mountaineering Championship, and won Bronze

References

External links 
 Andrés Jorquera Tapia at SkiMountaineering.org
 Andrés Jorquera Tapia at Mining Engineering Department, University of Chile 

1976 births
Living people
Chilean male ski mountaineers
Mountain guides
University of Santiago, Chile alumni
Academic staff of the Andrés Bello National University